Conspectus of the Ornithological Fauna of the USSR is a 1991 Russian language publication by ornithologist L. S. Stepanyan.

It contains a list of bird species recorded from the former Soviet Union, together with details of their distribution, taxonomic relationships and subspecies.

Taxonomic changes

The following is a list of the species splits & lumps proposed by Stepanyan:

 Siberian herring gull (Larus heuglini), together with the race vegae to be regarded as a separate species from herring and lesser black-backed gulls.
 Asian and lesser short-toed larks to be regarded as separate species
 Yellow-headed (Motacilla lutea), green-headed (M. taivana) and black-headed (M. feldegg) wagtails split from yellow wagtail (M. flava)
 Masked (Motacilla personata) and black-backed (M. lugens) wagtails split from white wagtail (M. alba)
 Eastern great (Parus minor), Turkestan (P. bokharensis), and Grey (P. cinereus) tits split from great tit (P. major)
 Ussuri (oriental, grey-bellied) (Pyrrhula griseiventris) and grey (P. cineracea) bullfinches split from common bullfinch (P. pyrrhula)

References

Bibliography
 Madge, Steve (1991) Splitting and lumping in the Soviet Union Birding World 4(11):401-4
 Voous, K. H. (1977) List of recent Holarctic bird species

Ornithological literature